South Starworld Strikers Football Club was a professional football team, which played in Trinidad and Tobago's Professional Football League.  The club played their home matches in Ato Boldon Stadium, in Couva, Trinidad.

History
The team joined the TT Pro League beginning in the 2002 season, having previously played in Trinidad's Southern Football Association. They joined the league with the explicit intention of representing the south of Trinidad, previously underrepresented in football circles.

The club finished its first season with a 4 wins, 10 ties, and 14 losses.  They improved significantly in their second season, however, going 17–7–12 and finishing fourth in the league.  They maintained a similar standing in 2004, again finishing fourth, this time with a 10–6–5 record. In 2005, they did not compete because of financial difficulties, but they were back again in the 2006 season.

Football clubs in Trinidad and Tobago
2006 disestablishments in Trinidad and Tobago